Alexandra Gardens  may refer to:
Alexandra Gardens, Melbourne, Victoria, Australia
Alexandra Gardens, Windsor, Berkshire, England
Alexandra Gardens, Cathays Park, Cardiff, Wales

See also
Alexandra Park (disambiguation)